"Brate Murate" is a single by the Serbian rock supergroup Familija, released in 1996.

Background 
Having released the first album, the band recorded a CD single featuring two songs. "Brate Murate" later appeared on the band's second album Seljačka buna and the B-side, "Ringišpil", was taken from their previous album Narodno pozorište.

Since the band's drummers Ratko "Rale" Ljubičić and Goran "Gedža" Redžepi left the band, Marko Milivojević played the drums on "Brate Murate". The track was produced by Aleksandar "Saša" Habić at PGP RTS Studio 5.

Track listing 
 "Ringišpil" (2:19) (Dejan Pejović)
 "Brate Murate" (2:57) (Aleksandar Vasiljević, Dejan Petrović)

Familija 
 Aleksandar "Luka" Lukić (bass)
 Aleksandar "Vasa" Vasiljević (guitar, vocals)
 Dejan "Peja" Pejović (vocals)
 Dejan "Dexi" Petrović (vocals)
 Marko Milivojević (drums)

References 
 Brate Murate at Discogs
 EX YU ROCK enciklopedija 1960-2006,  Janjatović Petar;  

1996 singles
1996 songs